Wonosobo is a town and regency seat of Wonosobo Regency (Kabupaten Wonosobo), on the island of Java. Wonosobo Regency is one of the regencies of Central Java province in Indonesia.

References

External links 

Regency seats of Central Java